"The Life to Come" is a short story by English writer E. M. Forster, written in 1922 and published posthumously in The Life to Come (and Other Stories) in 1972.

It was written into four chapters: Night, Evening, Day and Morning.

In 2017 Surrey Opera gave the world premiere of The Life to Come, an opera in two acts by British composer Louis Mander, with libretto by Stephen Fry.

External links 
Plot summary

1972 short stories
Short stories by E. M. Forster
1922 short stories